Laura Wienroither (born 13 January 1999) is an Austrian professional footballer who plays as a defender for Arsenal in the FA Women's Super League and the Austria women's national team.

On 15 January 2022, Wienroither joined FA WSL side Arsenal from German club 1899 Hoffenheim for an undisclosed fee.

International goals

Honours 
St. Pölten

 ÖFB-Frauenliga: 2017–18    
 ÖFB Ladies Cup: 2017–18        

Arsenal
 FA Women's League Cup: 2022–23

References

External links

1999 births
Living people
Women's association football defenders
Austrian women's footballers
Austria women's international footballers
SV Neulengbach (women) players
FSK St. Pölten-Spratzern players
Frauen-Bundesliga players
TSG 1899 Hoffenheim (women) players
2. Frauen-Bundesliga players
Austrian expatriate women's footballers
Austrian expatriate sportspeople in Germany
Expatriate women's footballers in Germany
Union Kleinmünchen players
ÖFB-Frauenliga players
Arsenal W.F.C. players
People from Vöcklabruck
Footballers from Upper Austria
UEFA Women's Euro 2022 players
Austrian expatriate sportspeople in England
Expatriate women's footballers in England